A chicane is a serpentine curve in a road, added by design rather than dictated by geography. Chicanes add extra turns and are used both in motor racing and on roads and streets to slow traffic for safety. For example, one form of chicane is a short, shallow S-shaped turn that requires the driver to turn slightly left and then slightly right to continue on the road, requiring the driver to reduce speed. The word chicane is derived from the French verb chicaner, which means "to create difficulties" or "to dispute pointlessly", "quibble", which is also the root of the English noun chicanery.

Motor racing 

On modern racing circuits, chicanes are usually located after long straights, making them a prime location for overtaking. They can be placed tactically by circuit designers to prevent vehicles from reaching speeds deemed to be unsafe. A prime example of this is the three chicanes at the Autodromo Nazionale Monza, introduced in the early 1970s; the Chase at Mount Panorama, added in 1987; and the Tamburello chicane at Imola, which was placed in 1995 after Ayrton Senna's death at the original corner.

Some tracks, such as the Yas Marina Circuit in Abu Dhabi, feature optional chicanes. Faster cars will take the chicane, but slower cars (such as amateur club racers) may avoid the chicane because they are not capable of reaching equally high speeds on the straights. Circuit de Barcelona-Catalunya has one at Europcar, which became the source of controversy when it was instituted for MotoGP after a fatal crash.  At Daytona International Speedway, there is an optional chicane near pit entrance to slow vehicles for safety reasons because of issues with certain vehicles as to prevent brake failure entering the high-speed Turn 1 by splitting the acceleration from the backstretch chicane to Turn 1 into two sections to slow vehicles down.

Another example is the Tsukuba Circuit in Japan.  A chicane was added after Turn 7, creating a right turn, followed immediately by a left.  This chicane is used only for motorcycles. It was implemented to divert motorcycles from taking Turn 8, which is a high-speed long sweeping left turn. Turn 8 was deemed unsafe for motorcycles, as immediately following this is a slow right hairpin turn.  This means riders may still have been leaning to the left when being expected to begin braking for Turns 9 and 10.

Chicanes can make slipstreaming less potent and break up pelotons during motor races.

The term is used in other types of racing, such as bobsleigh, to indicate a similar shift in the course or track.

A slower driver or vehicle that delays competitors is sometimes disparaged as a mobile chicane or moving chicane. In some cases they may not move out of the way quickly enough to allow competitors in higher positions (having completed more laps) past, despite repeated showings of blue flags.  This can cost competitors valuable time and championship points. This same term, applied to traffic calming, can refer to the usage of portable devices to create a chicane configuration.

Traffic calming 

Chicanes are a type of "horizontal deflection" used in traffic calming schemes to reduce the speed of traffic.  Drivers are expected to reduce speed to negotiate the lateral displacement in the vehicle path. There are several variations of traffic-calming chicanes, but they generally fall into one of two broad categories:

 Single-lane working chicanes, which consist of staggered build-outs, narrowing the road so that traffic in one direction has to give way to opposing traffic
 Two-way working chicanes, which use build-outs to provide deflection, but with lanes separated by road markings or a central island.

Limited accident data for chicane schemes indicate changes in injury accidents (range from −54% to +32%) and accident severity.

Chicanes can also be used to prevent access to certain vehicles. The Vermont Agency of Transportation has considered adding chicanes to Route 108 in Stowe and Cambridge to prevent the passage of tractor-trailers, which often get stuck further up the road.

Pedestrian 
A pedestrian chicane is a kind of permanent fence used at a railway crossing to slow pedestrians down and to force them to observe both directions before crossing the railway tracks. While passing the chicane, one has to turn to the left and to the right, increasing the probability of seeing an approaching train. A similar arrangement is sometimes used at the entrances of parks to impede bicycle, car, mobility scooter, and wheelchair access.

See also 
 Crowd control barrier

References

External links 
 
 

Motorsport terminology
Perimeter security
Transportation planning
Traffic calming